The Empire State Aerosciences Museum (commonly referred to as ESAM) is a non-profit museum which strives to "educate, entertain and excite with experiences in air and space".

ESAM sponsors an annual air show at the Schenectady Airport.

Exhibits
The museum has a collection of military aircraft outside the main building, in the Agneta Airpark including: 

 Bell UH-1 Iroquois
 Convair F-102A Delta Dagger
 Douglas A-4F Skyhawk II
 Douglas F3D Skyknight (Transferred from Intrepid Sea, Air & Space Museum)
 Fairchild Republic A-10 Thunderbolt II
 Grumman A-6E Intruder 
 Grumman F-14A Tomcat
 Grumman S-2 Tracker (arrived in 2009)
 LTV A-7E Corsair II
 McDonnell-Douglas F-4D Phantom II
 McDonnell F-101F Voodoo
 Mikoyan-Gurevich MiG-15 (USSR) (Transferred from Intrepid Sea, Air & Space Museum)
 Mikoyan-Gurevich MiG-17F (USSR)
 Mikoyan-Gurevich MiG-21 (USSR)
 North American RA-5C Vigilante
 North American T-2C Buckeye
 Northrop F-5E Tiger II
 Republic F-84F Thunderstreak
 Republic F-105G Thunderchief ("Wild Weasel" variant)
 Supermarine Scimitar (Transferred from Intrepid Sea, Air & Space Museum)

ESAM's two galleries contain more fragile aircraft, detailed models, artifacts, memorabilia and photographs. Other exhibits include the Amelia Earhart Exhibit, the DePischoff "flying motorcycle", and a 32' scale model of the Japanese World War II aircraft carrier Akagi. There are also several interactive displays. In addition, the museum houses the Wallace Holbrook Restoration Center which treats aircraft in various stages of restoration. Examples on display indoors include:

Aeronca 65LB Chief
Fisher FP-303
Folland Gnat F.1
Hughes OH-6A Cayuse
Mooney M-18LA Mite
Peterson J-4 Javelin
Rand Robinson KR-2
Rensselaer RP-1
Stits SA-7D Sky-Coupe

Research Library
The primary mission of the Janz Vander Veer Research Center/Library is to support the museum's education, exhibit and restoration programs. In addition, it serves as a resource to the general public for historical and technical aeroscience related information, such as astudent with a term paper assignment, a model builder, a media reporter or an author doing research.

The library contents are made up of a broad collection of books, brochures, photographs, technical manuals, periodicals, scrapbooks, artwork and audiovisual items. Its content is particularly strong in the Pioneer, World War I, "Golden Era" and World War II periods (1910–1950).

The Attil Pasquini Collection has over 2,100 photographs that can be searched using a PastPerfect software database. The Frank Coffyn Collection is a gift from the estate of Kingsland Adams Coffyn by the Green family to the Empire State Aerosciences Museum. The collection contains about 200 photos of Wright Flyers aircraft taken by Coffyn who worked for the Wright Brothers.

The Rick Allen Collection has added many books and a large amount of research materials to the library catalog.

The library is open on Friday and Saturday from 9 am to 12 noon. Arrangements for research may be made by contacting the library office.

Empire State Aviation Hall of Fame
The Empire State Aviation Hall of Fame, located on museum grounds, recognizes the contributions made by New York State aviation pioneers.

Hours and prices
During the summer from Father's Day to Labor day, ESAM is open Tuesday to Sunday, 10:00 am to 4:00 pm. For the remainder of the year, ESAM is open on Fridays, Saturdays and Sundays from 10:00 am to 4:00 pm. Private tours for groups of 10 or more are available with reservation.

General admission costs are as follows:
 $8.00 for adults 
 $6.00 for senior citizens and military personnel (with ID)
 $5.00 for children aged 6 to 16
 Those under six are admitted free of charge.
 ESAM Members are granted free admission with a current ESAM membership card.

The museum has a virtual reality ride that costs $5.00 per person in addition to the admission charge.

See also

 North American aviation halls of fame
 List of aerospace museums

References

External links

Aviation Enthusiast: ESAM info and reviews
Photos of aircraft and aviation exhibits at ESAM

Aerospace museums in New York (state)
Museums in Schenectady County, New York
Military and war museums in New York (state)
Halls of fame in New York (state)
Aviation halls of fame
History organizations based in the United States
New York State Z